Soyo is a thick soup of meat crushed in a mortar, seasoned with several spices and vegetables.

It is a meal that is always found in the traditional Paraguayan cooking and as all the others, has an important caloric value.

Although it was previously considered as a meal only eaten by the people of scarce resources, it has become extraordinarily popular in every social stratum in Paraguay.

Origin of the name
The word “soyo” is short for “so’o josopy”, Guaraní words for “meat” (so’o) and “crushed” (josopyré). The literal translation is “crushed Elded
When the meat is not crushed and instead it is boiled in the soup chopped in little pieces, it called “so’o josopy ita’y”, which it’s interpreted as curdle soup. In this case, it means that the meal is obviously less tasteful that the original version.

Ingredients

The traditional recipe uses crushed meat, cold water, rice, oil or grease, onion, sweet red pepper, tomato, scallion, a little flour, salt, oregano and parsley.

Preparation

The “so’o josopy” is prepared this way: The meat and rice is either crushed with a mortar or ground up in a blender until it forms a paste. This paste is put in a bowl with cold water and stirred. Chop up the vegetables you want to use as seasoning. These can include onion, tomato, sweet red pepper and scallion. Then put them in a saucepan with hot oil.

Then add the flour to the sauce and mix this with the meat, rice and water. Stir continuously until it boils. Finally add the salt, oregano and parsley.
If you make to make it thicker, put in a blender.

References
“Tembi’u Paraguay” de Josefina Velilla de Aquino
“Karú rekó – Antropología culinaria paraguaya”, de Margarita Miró Ibars

Indigenous cuisine of the Americas
Guaraní words and phrases
Paraguayan soups

gn:So'o josopy